John Keith Syers (1939 – 16 July 2011) was an Anglo-New Zealand academic and academic administrator.

Academic career
After a PhD at Durham University Syers spend two years working with T.W. Walker at Lincoln University before moving to the University of Wisconsin–Madison. He moved to Massey University in 1972 to head the new  Soil Science department. He primary interest was nutrient cycling in farmland. In 1985 Syers moved to Newcastle University.

Selected works 
 Efficiency of soil and fertilizer phosphorus use reconciling changing concepts of soil phosphorus behaviour with agronomic information
 The sustainable management of vertisols
 Nutrient management for sustainable crop production in Asia

References

External links
 google scholar 
 institutional homepage

New Zealand soil scientists
British soil scientists
University of Wisconsin–Madison faculty
Academic staff of the Lincoln University (New Zealand)
Academics of Newcastle University
Academic staff of the Massey University
1939 births
2011 deaths
Alumni of King's College, Newcastle